Verdal Station is a railway station located in the town of Verdalsøra in the municipality of Verdal in Trøndelag county, Norway.

History
The station was opened on 1 November 1904 on the Hell–Sunnan Line as the section to Verdal was finished. It was built based upon designs by Paul Armin Due. It was named Værdalen until 1 June 1919 when it was changed to its present name.

The station is located along the Nordland Line and it serves the entire municipality of Verdal except the Vinne area which is served by Bergsgrav Station.  The station is served by the Trøndelag Commuter Rail service between Steinkjer and Trondheim and also by regional trains to Bodø and Trondheim.

References

External links
Verdal at Bane NOR

Railway stations in Verdal
Railway stations on the Nordland Line
Railway stations opened in 1904
1904 establishments in Norway
National Romantic architecture in Norway
Art Nouveau railway stations